Navia is a municipality in the Autonomous Community of the Principality of Asturias, Spain. It lies on the Cantabrian Sea, and is bordered by the municipalities of Villayón to the south, Valdés to the east, and Coaña to the west. It is also the name of a parish and a village in the municipality.

The Navia River flows through the municipality.

Parishes
Andés
Anleo
Navia
Piñera
Polavieja
Puerto de Vega
Villanueva
Villapedre

References

External links
Web del Descenso de la ría del mismo nombre 
Federación Asturiana de Concejos 
Asociación Juvenil de Navia (AJUNA) 
Enlaces sobre Navia. Guía del Occidente 
Club Natación Villa de Navia 

Municipalities in Asturias